KLEX may refer to:

 The ICAO code for Blue Grass Airport
 KLEX (AM), a radio station (1570 AM) licensed to Lexington, Missouri, United States